VSR may refer to:

 VSR-10 rifles by Tokyo Marui
 VSR V8 Trophy, a stock car racing series
 V&S Railway, Kansas, USA, reporting mark
 Voltage-sensitive relay in electronics
 Variable shunt reactor, high voltage stabilizer
 Very Special Relativity in physics
 Very short patch repair in DNA
 Victorian Scottish Regiment, Australia
 Virtual Super Resolution on AMD graphics cards
 Vibratory Stress Relief in mechanical engineering
 Vincenzo Sospiri Racing, an Italian auto racing team